The FC Civics Windhoek (Civics) is a Namibian football club based in Windhoek. The Civics play in the highest division of Namibian football, the Namibia Premier League. The club has its home in Khomasdal, in the north of the Namibian capital Windhoek.

From 2000 the club is also known as Buschschule Civics.

They play their home games at Sam Nujoma Stadium in Katutura, Windhoek.

FC Civics were founded by a group of young students in 1983, who initially named the team after a local street – Bethlehem Boys. The club later became the Mighty Civilians before being recast again as Civics. Even today, the bulk of the squad comes either from Khomasdal or the neighbouring township of Katutura.

Over the past few years, residents of this underprivileged area have risen from a useful street team to Namibia's top league with the help of Helmut Scharnowski, who hails from the northern German city of Flensburg.

Achievements
Namibia Premier League: 3
2005, 2006, 2007

NFA-Cup: 2
2003, 2008

Performance in CAF competitions
CAF Champions League: 3 appearances
2004 – First Round
2006 – Second Round
2007 – First Round

Current squad (2011–12)

Further reading
Civics hit the heights (FIFA.com) 09 Oct 2006; accessed 05 Nov 2006

External links
 
 Civics website

1983 establishments in South West Africa
Association football clubs established in 1983
Football clubs in Namibia
Namibia Premier League clubs
Sport in Windhoek